Bad Tabarz is a municipality in the district of Gotha, in Thuringia, Germany. It is a winter sports resort and the terminus of the Thüringerwaldbahn rural tramway.

References

Municipalities in Thuringia
Gotha (district)
Saxe-Coburg and Gotha
Spa towns in Germany